Lemanu Palepoi Sialegā Mauga (born January 3, 1960) is an American Samoan politician who is serving as the eighth governor of American Samoa since January 3, 2021. A member of the Democratic Party, Mauga served as a senator in the American Samoa Senate, where he became the chairman of both the Budget and Appropriations Committee and the Senate Homeland Security Committee.

Early life and education 
Mauga was born in Nu'uuli, American Samoa. After attending the American Samoa Community College, he earned a Bachelor of Arts degree from the University of Hawaiʻi at Mānoa. He received a master's degree in public administration from San Diego State University on July 30, 2012, a graduation ceremony held at the Governor H. Rex Lee Auditorium in American Samoa.

Career
Mauga served in the U.S. military for more than 20 years, including the Persian Gulf War, and Iraqi/Afghanistan War, before he retired with the rank of major. Following his retirement, Mauga became the director of Army Instructions and continued to work with American Samoa's JROTC.

Mauga also became the chief property manager for the Government of American Samoa's office of property management. He became an American Samoan Senator in 2009.

Politics
In October 2011, gubernatorial candidate Lolo Letalu Matalasi Moliga picked Mauga as his running mate for lieutenant governor of American Samoa in the forthcoming 2012 gubernatorial election on November 6, 2012.
Mauga was Lieutenant Governor of American Samoa from 2013 to 2021.

In the 2020 American Samoa gubernatorial election, Mauga and his running mate Talauega Eleasalo Ale were elected governor and lieutenant governor respectively. Mauga assumed the office in January 2021.

References

External links

 Official Biography

|-

|-

 

21st-century American politicians
American Samoa Democrats
American Samoa Senators
American Samoan politicians
Democratic Party governors of American Samoa
Governors of American Samoa
Lieutenant Governors of American Samoa
Living people
People from Nu'uuli
San Diego State University alumni
United States Army officers
United States Marines
University of Hawaiʻi at Mānoa alumni
Year of birth uncertain
1949 births